Hillarie Danielle Ang Parungao-Donato (born 18 March 1991) is a Filipino TV presenter, model and beauty pageant titleholder who was crowned Miss World Philippines 2015. She represented the Philippines at the Miss World 2015 pageant and finished as a Top 10 semifinalist.

Early life and education
Parungao is Filipino-Chinese. She was born on March 18, 1991, in Solano, Nueva Vizcaya, Philippines. She is a graduate of BS Nursing at Aldersgate College.

Personal life
In October 2019, Parungao got married with her boyfriend, Arllie Donato.

Pageantry

Miss Asia Pacific World 2014
Parungao was appointed and represented the Philippines in Miss Asia Pacific World 2014 in Seoul, Korea where she placed 3rd Runner-up.

May Myat Noe, Miss Asia Pacific World 2014, was later dethroned and stripped of her title due to disagreement with MAPW organizers advancing Hillarie to 2nd Runner-up.

Miss World Philippines 2015
On 18 October 2015, Parungao joined Miss World Philippines 2015 and won succeeding Valerie Weigmann.

On 2 October 2016, Parungao crowned Catriona Gray as her successor at the Miss World Philippines 2016 pageant held at the Manila Hotel in Manila, Philippines.

Miss World 2015
As Miss World Philippines, Parungao represented the Philippines at the Miss World 2015 pageant in China where she bagged the Multimedia Award. She made it to the Top 10 finalists on the finals night.

References

External links

Living people
Miss World Philippines winners
Filipino female models
Filipino people of Chinese descent
Chinese female models
People from Nueva Vizcaya
1991 births
Miss World 2015 delegates